United Nations Security Council resolution 1278, adopted without a vote on 30 November 1999, after noting the resignation of International Court of Justice (ICJ) judge Stephen M. Schwebel taking effect on 29 February 2000, the council decided that elections to the vacancy on the ICJ would take place on 2 March 2000 at the security council and at a meeting of the General Assembly during its 54th session.

Schwebel, an American jurist, was a member of the court since January 1981, vice-president of the ICJ from 1994 to 1997 and its president since 1997. His term of office was due to expire in February 2006.

See also
 Judges of the International Court of Justice
 List of United Nations Security Council Resolutions 1201 to 1300 (1998–2000)

References

External links
 
Text of the Resolution at undocs.org

 1278
 1278
November 1999 events